Stegothrips is a genus of thrips in the family Phlaeothripidae.

Species
 Stegothrips albiceps
 Stegothrips barronis

References

Phlaeothripidae
Thrips
Thrips genera